Khalid Abdullah may refer to:

Khalid bin Abdullah (1937–2021), Saudi prince
Khalid bin Abdullah (1941–1985), Saudi prince
Khalid bin Abdullah, (born 1950), Saudi prince
Khalid Abdullah (linebacker) (born 1979), former American and Canadian football player
Khalid Abdullah (running back) (born 1995), American football player
Khalid Abdullah (Egyptian), first husband of Zaynab Khadr and suspect in the 1995 attack on the Egyptian Embassy in Pakistan

See also
Khalid Abdalla (born 1980), British actor
Syed Abdullah Khalid (1942–2017), sculptor from Bangladesh
Khalid Abdullah Almolhem (born 1957), Saudi Arabian businessman
Khalid Abdullah Mishal al Mutairi (born 1975), Kuwaiti charity worker who was unlawfully detained